Pandit Balachandra Siddhanta-Shastri (पंडित बालचंद्र सिद्धान्तशास्त्री) was a scholar and linguist who bridged classical and modern scholarship in  Jainism during the mid-20th century.

Life
Born in 1905 at Sonrai, in the district of Sagar in Bundelkhand, Madhya Pradesh, he attended the traditional Jain institution at Sadhumal. He later studied at Kashi Vidyapith.
He worked for several Jain institutions in India during his life as a scholar. His efforts resulted in the publication of several major Jain texts. He died in Hyderabad in 1985.

Contributions
His contributions include

 Satkhandagama along with Dhavala: volumes 6-16, translation.
 Tiloyapannatti, vol. 1-2, translation.
 Padmanandi's Panchvinshati, translation and commentary.
 Jain Lakshnavali (Jain Paribhashik Sabdakosh) (An Authentic and Descriptive Dictionary of Jaina Philosophical Terms)1972-1979, editor.
 Dhyansataka Or Dhyanstav Of Bhaskarnandi, editing and translation
 Atmanushasana of Gunabhadra, editing and translation.
 Lokavibhaga of Simhasuri, editing and translation.
 Punysarava-kathakosa of  Ramachandra, editing and translation.

See also
 Golapurva
 Satkhandagama
 Jainism in Bundelkhand

Footnotes and references

20th-century Indian Jain writers
1905 births
1985 deaths
Mahatma Gandhi Kashi Vidyapith
20th-century Indian linguists
People from Sagar district